The Star FM Music Awards were established in 2019 by  Star FM to celebrate outstanding musicians on their radio station. The awards are presented annually, and are broadcast live on Facebook. The annual presentation ceremony features performances by artists.

Host cities

Current award categories
Artist of the Year
Best Male Artist
Best Female Artist
Best Duo/Group
Best African Pop Song
Best Sungura Song
Best Zimdancehall Song
Best Hiphop Song
Best RnB Song
Best House Song
Best Song by Zimbabwean in the Diaspora
Best Gospel Song
Best Newcomer
Best Collaboration
Best Producer
Song of the Year
Album of the Year

Past award winners

2019

Artist of the Year
Best Male Artist
Best Female Artist
Best Duo/Group
Best African Pop Song
Best Sungura Song
Best Zimdancehall Song
Best Hiphop Song
Best RnB Song
Best House Song
Best Song by Zimbabwean in the Diaspora
Best Gospel Song
Best Newcomer
Best Collaboration
Best Producer
Song of the Year
Album of the Year

References

External links
 Star FM Music Awards official site
 Star FM Award winners list

 
Awards established in 2019
African music awards
2019 establishments in Zimbabwe
Mass media in Harare